Hristo Hristov (born 27 April 2001) is a Bulgarian male weightlifter.

Career

Olympics
In 2021 he competed at the 2020 Summer Olympics in the 109 kg category. He could have won a bronze medal, but referees rejected his successful last attempt on 222kg clean and jerk.

Major results

References

External links
 
 
 

Living people
2001 births
Bulgarian male weightlifters
Weightlifters at the 2018 Summer Youth Olympics
Sportspeople from Varna, Bulgaria
European Weightlifting Championships medalists
World Weightlifting Championships medalists
Weightlifters at the 2020 Summer Olympics
Olympic weightlifters of Bulgaria
21st-century Bulgarian people